A Woman's Secret is a 1949 film noir directed by Nicholas Ray and starring Maureen O'Hara, Gloria Grahame and Melvyn Douglas. The film was based on the novel Mortgage on Life by Vicki Baum.

Plot
In a story told in a series of flashbacks, singer Marian Washburn loses her voice. Aided by her pianist, Luke Jordan, they promote a young singer, Susan Caldwell. When Susan decides to quit the business, she is shot and seriously wounded in the Park Avenue apartment in New York that she and Marian share. When the police arrive, Marian confesses.

Luke believes there must be more to this. He hires attorney Brook Matthews, who has a past relationship with Susan and, to Police Inspector Fowler, Luke explains at length how he and Marian came to know Susan.

After an audition, Susan, an aspiring singer from Azusa, California, collapsed from starvation in front of them. Luke and Marian took her home to take care of her, and heard her voice. They decided to promote Susan's career, taking her to France, where as a performer she became known as "Estrellita," but, behind their backs, briefly ran off to Algiers with a soldier, Lee Crenshaw.

In the present, as Susan fights for her life trying to survive the gunshot wound in a hospital, Crenshaw  gets into a verbal confrontation with Luke while admitting that he had given her a Luger pistol from the war as a gift.

Luke relates to Fowler and the inspector's amateur-sleuth wife, Mary, how on a boat home from France they encountered Brook, the influential lawyer, just as they hoped they might. Brook had been known to sponsor young talent and, before long, he became Susan's patron, with a personal relationship also developing between them.

When she comes to in the hospital, a delirious Susan confirms the story Marian has told, that she was shot by Marian after their quarrel. Mary points out to her detective husband that Susan had just finished reading a newspaper account of the crime and could have been influenced by that.

A piece of key evidence leads to the truth, that Susan possessed the gun and, when Marian became concerned that Susan might be contemplating suicide, they struggled over the weapon and it went off. Charges are dismissed and Marian returns to Luke.

Cast

Reception

Box office
The film recorded a loss of $760,000.

Critical response
When the film was released, the staff at Variety magazine gave the film a mixed review, writing, "There's too much unintended mystery about A Woman's Secret for it to be anything but spotty entertainment ... O’Hara gives a straightforward account of herself. Grahame carries handicap of bad makeup and unbecoming hairdress, and Douglas is too coy as the piano-playing friend. Flippen is topnotch as the detective, lifting his scenes, as does Mary Phillips as his amateur private-eye wife."

More recently, film critic Dennis Schwartz, panned the film, writing, "Nicholas Ray (Rebel Without a Cause/In a Lonely Place/Born to Be Bad) takes a routine 'woman's pic' and turns it into a somewhat oddly diverting noir film by using a few of his perverse touches to liven up the dry story. Though made before Ray's  'official' debut feature They Live by Night, A Woman's Secret was released afterward (new RKO studio boss Howard Hughes held up the release date for no apparent reason, but when released the film lost money as it failed to capitalize on Gloria Grahame's current career momentum which quickly faded) ... In the end, things get untangled. But it's resolved in such a half-hearted and unconvincing way, that the tidied up gem of a mess still gives off an awful stink."

References

External links
 
 
 
 
 
 

1949 films
1949 drama films
American drama films
American black-and-white films
Film noir
Films based on Austrian novels
Films directed by Nicholas Ray
Films scored by Friedrich Hollaender
Films with screenplays by Herman J. Mankiewicz
Films produced by Herman J. Mankiewicz
1940s English-language films
1940s American films